Lamar Card is an American film producer, film director and assistant film director. He is the CEO of the production company "Card International Motion Picture Corporation".

Filmography (excerpt)

 Flamingo Dreams (2000, director)
 Shadow Warriors (1995, director)
 Project Metalbeast (1995, executive producer)
 Resort to Kill (1994, executive producer)
 The JFK Assassination: The Jim Garrison Tapes (1992, co-executive producer)
 Blood of Others (1984, executive producer)
 Heart Like a Wheel (1983, executive producer)
 Savage Harvest (1981, co-producer)
 Disco Fever (1978, director, producer)
 Supervan (1977, director)
 Nashville Girl (1976, associate producer)
 The Swinging Barmaids (1975, associate producer)
 The Clones (1973, co-director, executive producer)

References

External links

American film directors
English-language film directors
American film producers
1942 births
Living people